This is list of universities and related institutions in Lebanon.

Universities
One public university and 28 private universities in Lebanon have licenses from the Ministry of Education and Higher Education. There are 32 universities in total.

1Affiliated to Balamand University.

University institutes and colleges
There are a total of eight private institutes officially recognized in Lebanon:

University institutes for religious studies

See also 

 List of colleges and universities by country
 List of colleges and universities

References

External links
 Pigier Business Schools
 https://universityimages.com/list-of-universities-in-lebanon/

Universities
Lebanon
Lebanon